General elections were held in Sweden on 20 September 1936. The Swedish Social Democratic Party remained the largest party, winning 112 of the 230 seats in the Andra kammaren of the Riksdag.

Results

References

General elections in Sweden
Sweden
General
Sweden